Omega is the name of various medium-format cameras and enlargers. The Simmon Brothers, known for their line of enlargers, built the original Simmon Omega cameras in the United States. These rangefinder cameras took 6x7cm photographs on 120 roll film. Later, Konica manufactured the Koni Omega line. The last models, including the Rapid Omega 200, came from Mamiya. This line had interchangeable lenses, including a 58 (or 60) mm wide-angle, a 90 mm normal lens, a 135 mm portrait lens, and a 180 mm telephoto. A close-up adapter was popular with wedding photographers.

Another line, the Omegaflex, was a twin-lens reflex camera. Its lenses and accessories were not interchangeable with those from the Omega line. The Omegaflex took 6x7 rectangular pictures on 120 roll film.  

Backs: The Omegaflex film holder interchanges with the Omega M, 100 (Press 2 in Japan) and 200, and permits mid-roll changes on the Omegaflex, M, and 200.  The earlier Koni Omega Rapid (Press in Japan) film holder is not compatible with the above, and does not permit mid-roll changes.

References

120 film cameras